is a Japanese manga series written and illustrated by Jinushi. The series began as a webcomic published on Twitter in March 2022. The series then began serialization in Square Enix's Monthly Big Gangan magazine in August 2022.

The manga won the 2022 Next Manga Award in the web category.

Story
Sasaki, an overworked salaryman, finds a release of his daily tensions in the customer service of Yamada, a winsome, cheery supermarket cashier. One day he finds himself working late, and, finding Yamada already done with work for the day, goes for a smoke, he finds a mysterious woman, "Tayama", who invites him to the smoking area behind the store.

Characters

The male protagonist; he is a tired middle-aged (aged 45) businessman working in sales in what is often a demanding and trying job (which Tayama calls a "black company"), who is refreshed by going to Yamada's checkout to make his purchases because of her friendly customer service manner. He doesn't recognise that his favourite, Yamada, is the same as his new smoking friend Tayama.

The female protagonist; a 24-year-old employee of Super S, who started as a part-timer 8 years ago. As Yamada, she is demure and the perfect customer handler; her real self (which, when she introduces to Sasaki as "Tayama") is much more cool, leather-jacketed with several ear-piercings. She invites Sasaki to come to the smoking area behind the store, which he then does regularly. Bemused and slightly upset that Sasaki can't discern that Yamada and Tayama are the same person, and somewhat upset by his putting Yamada on a pedestal (cf. finding her short-sleeved work outfit cute) whilst treating "Tayama" with extreme respect and consideration (cf. worrying that her bare stomach will be cold and giving her his jacket just in case).

The lady Manager of Super S, a supporter of Yamada (and what she observes of her relationship with Sasaki). Enjoys romance novels, and real-life approximations thereof.
Sasaki's boss
A bald man who tiresomely insists on turning the air conditioning off in the boiling heat of summer due to his own comparative coldness due to lack of hair; he unreasonably objects to employees using forehead cooling strips, which means they all suffer intensely.
Maezawa
Another senior of Yamada's at Super S- addressed as "Chief Maezawa", in charge of the cashiers- who recounts the story of a ghost in the store's smoking area to Yamada. Good with "lost" kids that need to find their parents.
Ohno
A mild-mannered middle-aged assistant manager at Super S.
Suzuki
Sasaki's sympathetic blond co-worker; father of Emi.

Production
Jinushi was serializing Rokurei - Tenseishi Rinne Kuyakusho Dairokkanbu Joreika Katsudouki in Monthly Big Gangan. He received advice from his editor to draw a short manga as an exercise in creative writing, which led him to creating the series. Since Rokurei which was being serialized, was a supernatural story, the manga was drawn to be more realistic, and since the author had a background in customer service sales, the story was set in a supermarket.

Publication
When the first chapter was posted on Twitter, the tweet received more than 190,000 likes (as of June 2, 2022), creating a huge response.  As of June 25, 2022, the total number of likes for the series had surpassed 2.5 million.

On August 25, 2022, the serialization in the magazine began in Monthly Big Gangan. In this issue, it appeared on the cover and in the opening color. On the same day, the first volume of the book with newly written chapters was also released. 

Volume list

Reception
Super no Ura de Yani Sū Futari won the 2022 Next Manga Award in the web category. The series ranked seventh in the 2023 edition of Takarajimasha's Kono Manga ga Sugoi! list of best manga for male readers. It was also nominated for the 16th Manga Taishō. The series was ranked fourth in the Nationwide Bookstore Employees' Recommended Comics of 2023 and first in the Nationwide Publishers' Recommended Comics of 2023. It has over 200,000 copies in circulation as of volume 1.

References

External links
  
 

Gangan Comics manga
Japanese webcomics
Seinen manga